CD1a (Cluster of Differentiation 1a) is a human protein encoded by the  gene.

This gene encodes a member of the CD1 family of transmembrane glycoproteins, which are structurally related to the major histocompatibility complex (MHC) proteins and form heterodimers with beta-2-microglobulin. The CD1 proteins mediate the presentation of primarily lipid and glycolipid antigens of self or microbial origin to T cells. The human genome contains five CD1 family genes organized in a cluster on chromosome 1. The CD1 family members are thought to differ in their cellular localization and specificity for particular lipid ligands. The protein encoded by this gene localizes to the plasma membrane and to recycling vesicles of the early endocytotic system. Alternatively spliced transcript variants have been observed, but their biological validity has not been determined. Transcript levels of the CD1A gene are upregulated in the lung parenchyma of smokers.

References

External links

Further reading

Clusters of differentiation